Giovanni Visconti (born 13 January 1983) is a former Italian professional road racing cyclist, who last rode for UCI ProTeam .

Professional career

Early career

Born in Turin, Visconti won his first race in 2006 at the Coppa Sabatini. One year later, he won the Italian National Road Race Championships on 1 July 2007, beating Paolo Bossoni and Davide Rebellin at the end in a sprint. At  to go Rebellin accelerated and left the main field, closely followed by Visconti, Bossoni, and Christian Murro (Tenax–Menikini). The four were able to keep the peloton away until the final meters.

In 2010, Visconti won the 2.HC Tour of Turkey overall classification after pocketing two stages along the way.

Movistar Team (2012–16)

Four  riders finished in the first five positions. In May, Visconti had to withdraw from the Giro d'Italia during the fifteenth stage due to shortness of breath. He was told by his entourage that the event had all the symptoms of a panic attack. He came back to racing and signed a victory at the Circuito de Getxo, where his puncheur qualities served him well on the final climb, where he outsprinted Danilo Di Luca. He went to the Vuelta a Burgos and finished seventh overall thanks to consistent placings, especially in the queen stage to the Lagunas de Neila where he was eighth. In December, it has been announced by the Italian National Olympic Committee that Visconti was suspended for 3 months and would have to pay a 10,000 Euros fine since he worked with doctor Michele Ferrari, who had been banned for life for doping athletes. Visconti has denied Ferrari had ever supplied him with doping products. The suspension started retroactively on 10 October 2012.

In 2015, Visconti won the best climber's jersey of the Giro d'Italia, thanks to attacks in the final stages of the race. He qualified his conquest of the blue jersey as "a consolation" since he was going for stage wins that did not materialize during those attacks. He was named in the start list for the 2015 Vuelta a España.

Major results

2003
 1st  Road race, UEC European Under-23 Road Championships
 1st  Road race, National Under-23 Road Championships
 1st GP Inda-Trofeo Aras Frattini
 1st Trofeo Gianfranco Bianchin
 1st GP Kranj
 5th Gran Premio Industrie del Marmo
2004
 1st GP Kranj
 1st Ronde van Vlaanderen Beloften
 Giro delle Regioni
1st Stages 2 & 4b
 2nd Menton–Savona
 7th Road race, UCI Under-23 Road World Championships
 8th Gran Premio Industrie del Marmo
2005
 3rd Firenze–Pistoia
 4th Overall Uniqa Classic
 4th GP Industria & Artigianato di Larciano
 4th Giro del Veneto
 4th Coppa Placci
 5th Coppa Ugo Agostoni
 7th Trofeo Città di Castelfidardo
 8th Trofeo Melinda
 10th Gran Premio Nobili Rubinetterie
2006
 1st Coppa Sabatini
 2nd Trofeo Melinda
 2nd Gran Premio Industria e Commercio di Prato
 4th Trofeo Laigueglia
 4th Coppa Placci
 5th Overall Brixia Tour
 8th Memorial Marco Pantani
2007
 1st  Road race, National Road Championships
 1st Coppa Sabatini
 1st Stage 2a Brixia Tour
 3rd Firenze–Pistoia
 4th Grand Prix de Wallonie
 9th Clásica de San Sebastián
 9th Giro di Lombardia
2008
 1st Grand Prix de Fourmies
 1st Stage 3 Vuelta a Andalucía
 2nd Road race, National Road Championships
 2nd Trofeo Pollença
 2nd Grand Prix Pino Cerami
 2nd Grand Prix de Wallonie
 2nd Memorial Cimurri
 2nd Japan Cup
 4th Brabantse Pijl
 4th Giro di Lombardia
 5th Coppa Ugo Agostoni
 9th Tre Valli Varesine
2009
 1st  UCI Europe Tour
 1st Coppa Ugo Agostoni
 1st Trofeo Melinda
 1st Gran Premio Industria e Commercio di Prato
 1st Stage 2 Tour of Slovenia
 2nd Gran Premio Bruno Beghelli
 2nd Coppa Sabatini
 2nd Memorial Marco Pantani
 3rd Gran Premio Industria e Commercio Artigianato Carnaghese
 5th Overall Giro di Sardegna
 5th Overall Settimana Internazionale di Coppi e Bartali
1st Stage 1b (TTT)
 6th Giro del Friuli
 6th Monte Paschi Strade Bianche
 6th Giro della Romagna
 6th Memorial Cimurri
 8th Gran Premio Nobili Rubinetterie
 8th Japan Cup
 9th Coppa Bernocchi
 9th Giro del Veneto
2010
 1st  UCI Europe Tour
 1st  Road race, National Road Championships
 1st  Overall Tour of Turkey
1st Stages 3 & 4
 1st Classica Sarda
 1st Stage 1 Tour de Luxembourg
 1st Stage 1 (TTT) Brixia Tour
 2nd Overall Tour of Slovenia
 2nd Gran Premio Città di Camaiore
 3rd Trofeo Melinda
 3rd Giro della Romagna
 3rd Coppa Sabatini
 4th Giro dell'Appennino
 4th Gran Premio Industria e Commercio di Prato
 5th Grand Prix de Wallonie
 7th Tre Valli Varesine
 8th Trofeo Matteotti
 10th Overall Giro di Sardegna
2011
 1st  UCI Europe Tour
 1st  Road race, National Road Championships
 1st Gran Premio dell'Insubria-Lugano
 1st Gran Premio Industria e Commercio Artigianato Carnaghese
 1st Stage 4 Settimana Ciclistica Lombarda
 2nd Overall Giro di Padania
 2nd GP Industria & Artigianato di Larciano
 2nd Grand Prix of Aargau Canton
 3rd Overall Tour of Oman
 3rd Gran Premio di Lugano
 3rd Gran Premio Bruno Beghelli
 3rd Coppa Bernocchi
 4th Overall Settimana Internazionale di Coppi e Bartali
1st  Points classification
1st Stage 5
 4th Memorial Marco Pantani
 4th Coppa Sabatini
 6th Hel van het Mergelland
 6th Grand Prix Pino Cerami
 7th Giro di Lombardia
 8th Montepaschi Strade Bianche
 8th Giro dell'Appennino
2012
 1st Klasika Primavera
 1st Circuito de Getxo
 3rd Memorial Marco Pantani
 4th Coppa Sabatini
 5th Gran Premio Industria e Commercio di Prato
 7th Overall Vuelta a Burgos
 7th Clásica de Almería
 7th Coppa Ugo Agostoni
 7th Giro dell'Emilia
 8th Coppa Bernocchi
 9th Gran Piemonte
 10th Gent–Wevelgem
2013
 Giro d'Italia
1st Stages 15 & 17
 7th Roma Maxima
 9th Gran Premio Nobili Rubinetterie
2014
 7th Circuito de Getxo
 9th Clásica de San Sebastián
2015
 1st  Mountains classification, Giro d'Italia
 2nd Memorial Marco Pantani
 6th Trofeo Serra de Tramuntana
 8th Trofeo Andratx-Mirador d'es Colomer
 8th Klasika Primavera
 8th Milano–Torino
2016
 1st Klasika Primavera
 3rd Overall Giro di Toscana
1st Stage 1
 3rd GP Industria & Artigianato di Larciano
 4th GP Miguel Induráin
 4th Coppa Ugo Agostoni
 5th Tre Valli Varesine
 8th Overall Tour du Haut Var
 8th Amstel Gold Race
 10th Trofeo Pollenca-Port de Andratx
2017
 1st Giro dell'Emilia
 2nd Overall Tour of Slovenia
 2nd Overall Giro della Toscana
 9th Overall Tour of Oman
2018
 Tour of Austria
1st  Points classification
1st Stages 2, 4 & 8
 2nd Road race, National Road Championships
 2nd Trofeo Matteotti
 4th Giro della Toscana
 5th Strade Bianche
 5th Gran Premio di Lugano
 6th GP Industria & Artigianato di Larciano
 9th Tre Valli Varesine
2019
 1st Giro della Toscana
 1st Stage 3 Tour of Austria
 1st  Mountains classification, Settimana Internazionale di Coppi e Bartali
 2nd Overall Tour of Slovenia
1st Stage 4
 2nd Tre Valli Varesine
 5th Overall Giro di Sicilia
 5th Overall Tour de Hongrie
 5th Coppa Agostoni
 5th La Drôme Classic
 6th GP Industria & Artigianato di Larciano
 6th Memorial Marco Pantani
 8th Gran Piemonte
2020
 9th Giro dell'Emilia
 9th Giro dell'Appennino
 Giro d'Italia
Held  after Stages 15–16

Grand Tour general classification results timeline

References

External links

 
 
 
 Giovanni Visconti  at Cycling Base

Italian male cyclists
1983 births
Living people
Cyclists from Turin
Presidential Cycling Tour of Turkey winners
Presidential Cycling Tour of Turkey stage winners
Italian Giro d'Italia stage winners
Doping cases in cycling
Italian sportspeople in doping cases
21st-century Italian people